The T-72 Adra or 'Mahmia' is a Syrian tank. It is a domestic upgrade to the T-72M1 that features slat armor, spaced armor, and chains to provide 360 degree protection from RPGs.

Background 
In the late ‘70s through the early ‘90s Syria imported a number of T-72M1 tanks from the Soviet Union, as well as Czechoslovakia. These tanks were used in the 1982 Lebanon War, with moderate effectiveness, after which it was called by Hafez Al-Assad, “The Best Tank in the World”. The Syrian Civil War took its toll on Syria’s T-72 fleet, with many tanks being lost in intense urban combat. To try to reduce these losses, while under an arms embargo, Syria developed the 'Adra' upgrade for their T-72 tanks in the town of Adra.

Design 
The Adra consists of spaced armor around the turret and at the front of the hull, with the spaced armour and chassis being covered in a layer of slat armour. The turret ring is also protected by steel chains which hang from the turret and are weighed down with steel balls, in the hope that they will offer similar performance to slat armor, but with more flexibility, however these are rarely effective and usually do not detonate the projectile.

Operational history 
The T-72 Adra was first deployed in Jobar in 2014, where two were confirmed to have been destroyed. As of November 2017 at least 11 T-72’s have been converted to this variant. But it went on to be deployed in Eastern Ghouta, and possibly Aleppo. However, by 2016, it was in wide use in Jobar, Qaboun, and Eastern Ghouta, and very limited use in Aleppo. The T-72 Adra is often used in urban areas where regular T-72’s would be vulnerable. It eventually proved to be vulnerable to rebel M79 Osa and RPG-29 anti-tank launchers and was later deployed in Daraa, though they have on 2 occasion stopped RPG-29’s and usually stop early model ATGM’s and RPG-7’s in 2017, to stop the rebel offensive in Al-Manshiyah by the 4th armoured Division of the Syrian Arab Army (SAA). 4th Division convoy towards Daraa included at least 4 tanks, 2 BMPs and 1 BREM-1 (+ several IRAM launchers).

See also 
 Armored warfare
 Asymmetrical warfare
 Improvised fighting vehicle
 Vehicle armor

References

External links
 Unpainted
 Desert Camo 1
 Desert Camo 2
 https://pbs.twimg.com/media/C-afDN7XoAEMCcE.jpg
 http://jobarnews.net/wp-content/uploads/2017/04/photo_2017-04-27_13-39-34-1024x682.jpg
 http://jobarnews.net/wp-content/uploads/2017/06/photo_2017-06-07_11-08-12-1024x682.jpg
 http://jobarnews.net/wp-content/uploads/2017/06/photo_2017-06-07_11-08-11-1024x682.jpg
 https://pbs.twimg.com/media/DBuwAKKW0AANvAx.jpg

Main battle tanks of Syria
Post–Cold War main battle tanks
T-72